The 1985 Milan–San Remo was the 76th edition of the Milan–San Remo cycle race and was held on 16 March 1985. The race started in Milan and finished in San Remo. The race was won by Hennie Kuiper of the Verandalux–Dries team.

General classification

References

1985
March 1985 sports events in Europe
1985 in road cycling
1985 in Italian sport
1985 Super Prestige Pernod International